WPZS (100.9 FM) is an Urban Gospel music station located in Charlotte, North Carolina but licensed to Indian Trail. The station is currently owned & operated by Urban One.  It carries the syndicated Yolanda Adams Morning Show.  The station's studios are located in Southwest Charlotte near Carowinds, and the transmitter site is in Matthews near the intersection of NC 51 and Monroe Road.

History
The station was located in Albemarle, North Carolina for many years, where it was called WABZ-FM.

Ted Bell hosted "Saturday Night Music Machine" while at WABZ-FM, interviewing Neil Sedaka, Debbie Reynolds, Freddie Cannon, George Burns, Phil Everly, Teresa Brewer, Tiny Tim, and Gene McDaniels. The show, which Bell hosted until 1982, featured stars such as Bobby Rydell and Chubby Checker. Bell also asked Johnny Olson of The Price Is Right to do station IDs.

Bill and Susi Norman, owners of WZKY and WXLX, bought WABZ December 28, 1993 (Jenni Communications Inc. was named for their 10-year-old daughter) from Piedmont Crescent Communications.

"Inspiration 100.9" played "Southern Gospel Music of today, yesterday and all the favorites", along with the Trading Post, local sports and ministry programs.  Johnny Caudle hosted the morning show from 1995 until 2000.

In 2004, WABZ moved to its current city of license and changed its letters and format, giving grade A signal quality to the Charlotte area. Radio One, Inc. announced on November 16 that it had purchased WPZS for $11.5 million and moved it to the company's Charlotte facilities. The company already operated WPZS under an LMA earlier in the month, changing the format to Urban contemporary gospel.

On August 31, 2011, Radio One announced its intention to sell off their Charlotte stations to Davis Broadcasting, but in April 2012 the deal fell through and Radio One decided to keep the stations.

On September 13, 2012, at Midnight, WPZS began simulcasting sister WQNC. WQNC and WPZS also swapped call letters on the same day.
  The two stations provide a strong combined signal with 60 percent overlap. The simulcast ended on August 14, 2015, with 100.9 reverting to the callsign WPZS.

References

External links
Station website

Urban One stations
PZS
Radio stations established in 1958
Gospel radio stations in the United States
1958 establishments in North Carolina
PZS